The Public Pays is a 1936 short crime film directed by Errol Taggart. In 1937, it won an Academy Award at the 9th Academy Awards for Best Short Subject (Two-Reel). The film shows a dramatization of actual court records which tell the story of a gang's racketeering in the milk industry, and its eventual defeat through the heroism of one dealer.

Plot
We see three tough-looking men renting an office in one of the better buildings of Claybourne City. Soon "The Creamery Betterment Association" appears on their door. They intend to force every dealer in the city to sign as members, dues to be one cent on every quart of milk sold in the city; and the dealers are to get this back by raising the price of milk three cents a quart.

Then comes the technique for getting members; the vicious means resorted to in "stubborn" cases. Only one dealer, John Paige has the courage to hold out. He cooperates with the police, but weakens when his family is threatened. Police persuade him to wait, replace all his drivers with detectives, who arrest the gangsters when they do attack the trucks. Finally, the police surround members of the gang who are waiting in ambush to drill Paige's trucks with a "tommy" gun. This provides sufficient evidence, and the gang is arrested and sent to prison for 50 years.

Cast
 Richard Alexander as Drunken Hood Who Knocks Over Milk Wagon (uncredited)
 Barbara Bedford as Markovitz's Secretary (uncredited)
 Harry C. Bradley as Grocer (uncredited)
 Betty Ross Clarke as Paige's Secretary (uncredited)
 Russ Clark as Bit Part (uncredited)
 John Dilson as Moore, Milk Company Executive (uncredited)
 Bess Flowers as Bit (uncredited)
 Karl Hackett as Markovitz, Milk Company Executive (uncredited)
 Robert Homans as Cop (uncredited)
 George Humbert as Simonelli, Italian Milk Dealer (uncredited)
 Cy Kendall as Police Chief John Carney (uncredited)
 Ivan Miller as Charles Paige (uncredited)
 William Pawley as Kelly (uncredited)
 Frank Puglia as Moran's Hood (uncredited)
 Edwin Stanley as John Allgren, Department of Justice (uncredited)
 Paul Stanton as Moran (uncredited)
 Ben Taggart as Cop (uncredited)
 Phillip Trent as MGM Reporter (uncredited)
 Emmett Vogan as Ardley, Moran's Assistant (uncredited)
 Frederick Vogeding as Dickman, Milk Company Executive (uncredited)
 Eddy Waller as The Association's Landlord (uncredited)

References

External links

1936 films
1936 crime films
Live Action Short Film Academy Award winners
American black-and-white films
Metro-Goldwyn-Mayer short films
1936 short films
American crime films
1930s English-language films
1930s American films